Kurdish tanbur or tanbour a fretted string instrument, is an initial and main form of the tanbūr instrument family, used by the Kurds. It is highly associated with the Yarsan (Ahl-e Haqq) religion in Kurdish areas and in the Lorestān provinces of Iran.  It is one of the few musical instruments used in Ahl-e Haqq rituals, and practitioners venerate the tembûr as a sacred object. Another popular percussion instrument used together with the tembur is the Kurdish daf, but that's not sacred in Yarsan spirituality and Jam praying ceremony.

Nowadays tembur is played all over Iran, but Kurdish tembur is mainly designed and has been for centuries in the Hawraman region in the provinces of Kermanshah Province, Kurdistan Province and Lorestan. The more traditional and accepted temburs originate from the cities of Kermanshah, Sahneh and Gahvareh. Tembur is locally called tamur, tamureh, tamyarah or tamyorah (تَمیُرَه ، تَمیرَه ، تموره, تمور) there. The Kermanshah tembur should not be confused with saz also called tembûr in Kurmancî Kurdish.

The tembûr measures 90 cm in length and 16 cm in width.  The resonator is pear-shaped and made of either a single piece or multiple carvels of mulberry wood.  The neck is made of walnut wood and has 13 or 14 frets or, arranged in a semi-tempered chromatic scale (one of the only middle eastern musical instruments not microtonal). The tembûr employs three metal strings that the first course is double. The melody is played on the double strings with a unique playing technique of strumming the right hand with each finger separately when motioning the hand upwards from the position beneath the strings.

Notable players
Ostad Elahi
Ali Akbar Moradi
Sohrab Pournazeri
Seyed Khalil Alinezhad
Farid Elhami

See also
Kurdish music
Lute

References

Sources

 

Necked bowl lutes
Kurdish musical instruments
Sacred musical instruments

sv:Tembûr